Gardel Gari Ali Aqa (also Romanized as Gardel Gārī ʿAlī Aqā) is a village in Ozgoleh Rural District, Ozgoleh District, Salas-e Babajani County, Kermanshah Province, Iran. At the 2006 census, its population was 68, in 13 families.

References 

Populated places in Salas-e Babajani County